Charlotte Schultz (1899–1946) was a German stage and film actress.

Selected filmography
 Die Liebe des Van Royk (1918)
 Helmsman Holk (1920)
 The Eternal Curse (1921)
 Fridericus Rex (1922)
 Downfall (1923)
 Anna Favetti (1938)
 Covered Tracks (1938)
 A Woman Like You (1939)
 Robert Koch (1939)
 The Journey to Tilsit (1939)
 The Girl from Fano (1940)
 A Salzburg Comedy (1941)
 Her Other Self (1941)
 Wedding in Barenhof (1942)
 Between Heaven and Earth (1942)
 Circus Renz (1943)
 The Master Detective (1944)
 Jan und die Schwindlerin (1947)

References

Bibliography 
 Hardt, Ursula. From Caligari to California: Erich Pommer's life in the International Film Wars. Berghahn Books, 1996.

External links 
 

1899 births
1946 deaths
German film actresses
German stage actresses